The 1970 Embassy British Indoor Championships was a combined men's and women's Grand Prix tennis tournament played on indoor carpet courts. It was the 3rd edition of the British Indoor Championships in the Open era. The tournament took place at the Wembley Arena in London in England and ran from 16 November until 21 November 1970.

The men's singles event and the $7,200 first prize was won by first–seeded Rod Laver while Billie Jean King won the women's singles title.

Finals

Men's singles

 Rod Laver defeated  Cliff Richey 6–3, 6–4, 6–4
 It was Laver's 14th title of the year and the 46th of his open era career.

Women's singles
 Billie Jean King defeated  Ann Jones 8–6, 3–6, 6–1

Men's doubles
 Ken Rosewall /  Stan Smith defeated  Ilie Năstase /  Ion Țiriac 6–4, 6–3, 6–2

Women's doubles
 Rosie Casals /  Billie Jean King defeated  Ann Jones /  Virginia Wade 6–3, 7–5

References

External links 
 ITF tournament edition details

British Indoor Championships
Wembley Championships
Embassy British Indoor Championships
Embassy British Indoor Championships
Embassy British Indoor Championships